Hareh Dasht (also known as 'Haradasht, Harah Dasht-e Jonūbī, and Kharadasht) is a village in Lisar Rural District, Kargan Rud District, Talesh County, Gilan Province, Iran. At the 2006 census, its population was 1,495, in 375 families.

References 

Populated places in Talesh County